The 2001 Calgary municipal election was held on October 15, 2001 to elect a Mayor and 14 Aldermen to Calgary City Council. Three term Calgary Aldermen Dave Bronconnier won 28 per cent of the vote defeating four term Aldermen Bev Longstaff and fifteen other candidates to become the 35th Mayor of Calgary.

Results

Mayor

Ward 1

Ward 2

Ward 3

Ward 4

Ward 5

Ward 6

Ward 7

Ward 8

Ward 9

Ward 10

Ward 11

Ward 12

Ward 13

Ward 14

See also
List of Calgary municipal elections

References

Calgary
2001
October 2001 events in Canada
2000s in Calgary